The Den Haag Knights are a rugby league football club based in The Hague (Den Haag), Netherlands. They compete in the Netherlands Rugby League Bond (NRLB) domestic competition called Dutch Rugby League Competition, as well as internationally.

2015 Competition

League Schedule

Player Statistics

End Of Season Awards

Players Earning International Caps

2016 Competition

League Schedule

Player Statistics

End Of Season Awards

Players Earning International Caps

 Matthew Rigby also attended both Netherlands matches as Netherlands Assistant Coach

2017 Competition

League Schedule

Player Statistics

End Of Season Awards

Players Earning International Caps

 Matthew Rigby also attended both Netherlands matches as Netherlands Assistant Coach

2018 Competition

League Schedule

* Forfeit victories due to team unavailability for R3 and R4.

Player Statistics

End Of Season Awards

Players Earning International Caps

 Matthew Rigby also attended both Netherlands matches as Netherlands Assistant Coach

2019 Competition

League Schedule

Player Statistics

End Of Season Awards

Players Earning International Caps

See also

 Netherlands Rugby League Bond
 Netherlands national rugby league team

References

External links

Rugby league in the Netherlands
Dutch rugby league teams
Rugby clubs established in 2014
2014 establishments in the Netherlands
Sports clubs in The Hague